Sabahudin Kurt (18 July 1935 – 30 March 2018) was a Bosnian folk and pop singer. Kurt represented Yugoslavia in Copenhagen in the Eurovision Song Contest 1964 with the entry "Život je sklopio krug". He finished in thirteenth place, scoring 0 points.

Kurt recorded his first song, "Dim u tvojim očima" ("Smoke in Your Eyes") in 1954.

Personal life
Kurt was born in Sarajevo, Bosnia and Herzegovina, an only child.

He had been married to Ismeta since 1966; the couple had two sons, Damir and Almir.

Kurt was among the guests honoring Serbian composer Kornelije Kovač on 25 November 2012 for the 50th anniversary of Kovač's professional career.

Later life
After suffering a heart attack and having triple-bypass surgery in 2007, Kurt retired from music and decided to live out the rest of his life in the Bosnian countryside. He moved to upper Vlakovo village in the Ilidža suburb of Sarajevo.

He was again hospitalized 29 August 2014 due to "cardiovascular problems". Kurt died 30 March 2018 of undisclosed causes at age 82.

Discography

Extended plays and singles
Dim u tvojim očima (1954)
Pjesma Sarajevu / Hvalisavi Mornar (1963)
Mala Sarajka / Sarajevske noći (1963)
Vaš Šlager Sezone '70 with Hamdija Čustović (1970)
Oj sevdahu što si težak ("Ilidža") (1972)
Temerav, Temerav (1974)

Compilation albums
Zlatni jubilej (2004)

References

External links

1935 births
2018 deaths
Singers from Sarajevo
Musicians from Sarajevo
Bosniaks of Bosnia and Herzegovina
20th-century Bosnia and Herzegovina male singers
Yugoslav male singers
Eurovision Song Contest entrants for Yugoslavia
Eurovision Song Contest entrants of 1964
Bosnia and Herzegovina folk-pop singers